The Fountain of Neptune is installed in Mexico City's Alameda Central, in Mexico. The fountain has a bronze sculpture depicting Neptune, the Roman God of the sea.

References

External links
 

Alameda Central
Bronze sculptures in Mexico
Fountains in Mexico
Outdoor sculptures in Mexico City
Sculptures of men in Mexico
Sculptures of Neptune
Statues in Mexico City